Hundelt is a surname. Notable people with the surname include:

Chris Hundelt (born 1963), American soccer player
Kevin Hundelt (born 1967), American soccer player and coach

See also
Hundert